The Best American Poetry 2009, a volume in The Best American Poetry series, was edited by poet David Wagoner, guest editor, who made the final selections, and David Lehman, the general editor for the series.

This book is the 22nd volume in the most popular annual poetry anthology in the United States.

See also
 2009 in poetry

Notes

External links
  Web page for the book
 

Best American Poetry series
2009 poetry books
Poetry
American poetry anthologies